Dmitri Andreyevich Merenchukov (born 3 March 1999) is a Russian football player. He plays for FC Spartak Kostroma.

Club career
He represented PFC CSKA Moscow in the 2016–17 UEFA Youth League and 2017–18 UEFA Youth League.

He made his debut in the Russian Premier League for FC Tambov on 5 December 2020 in a game against FC Spartak Moscow, as a starter.

References

External links
 
 

1999 births
People from Leninsk-Kuznetsky
Sportspeople from Kemerovo Oblast
Living people
Russian footballers
Russia youth international footballers
Association football forwards
PFC CSKA Moscow players
FC Novokuznetsk players
FC Tambov players
FC Saturn Ramenskoye players
FC Spartak Kostroma players
Russian Premier League players
Russian Second League players